Gilson do Amaral  (born April 4, 1984 in Américo Brasiliense), commonly known as Gilsinho, is a Brazilian footballer. He is a striker for Vila Nova Futebol Clube.

Career 
Gilsinho's early career was spent at clubs in São Paulo state, such as Marília, Ituano and Paulista. After a successful Campeonato Paulista campaign with the latter in 2017, during which he scored 8 goals, he signed with Júbilo Iwata from Brazilian club Paulista. The deal was initially a year's loan, with an option to make it permanent. The move was later made permanent, with Gilsinho penning a new contract with Júbilo. He was a regular starter in his four seasons stay, helping the club to the 2010 J. League Cup.

Corinthians signed Gilsinho ahead of the 2012 season. In July 2012 he moved to Sport Recife to play 2012 Campeonato Brasileiro Série A

On 12 July 2013, Gilsinho joined J1 League club Ventforet Kofu, replacing Paraguayan striker José Ortigoza. He returned to Brazil in 2015, joining up with former team-mate from Paulista Fernando Diniz, who was now coach of Audax At the end of the Campeonato Paulista season he returned to Japan with J2 League side FC Gifu, but didn't make much impact, being released at the end of the year.

He returned home to Brazil again at the start of 2016, signing with Atlético Goianiense for a season which culminated in winning the 2016 Campeonato Brasileiro Série B.

For the 2017 season, Gilsinho once again took a contract in Japan, with J2 League side Avispa Fukuoka.

In 2018 Gilsinho played with Mirassol in Campeonato Paulista, moving to Ferroviária to play in Série D until their early exit from the competition, at which point he signed for Botafogo-SP, playing a small part in their promotion from Série C. He signed for a second spell with Atlético Goianiense for the 2019 season.

Club statistics

References

External links

Profile at Avispa Fukuoka

1984 births
Living people
Brazilian footballers
Brazilian expatriate footballers
América Futebol Clube (SP) players
Ituano FC players
Marília Atlético Clube players
Paulista Futebol Clube players
Esporte Clube São Bento players
Júbilo Iwata players
Sport Club Corinthians Paulista players
Sport Club do Recife players
Grêmio Osasco Audax Esporte Clube players
Atlético Clube Goianiense players
Mirassol Futebol Clube players
Associação Ferroviária de Esportes players
Botafogo Futebol Clube (SP) players
Ventforet Kofu players
FC Gifu players
Avispa Fukuoka players
Vila Nova Futebol Clube players
Campeonato Brasileiro Série A players
Campeonato Brasileiro Série B players
Campeonato Brasileiro Série C players
Campeonato Brasileiro Série D players
J1 League players
J2 League players
Expatriate footballers in Japan
Brazilian expatriate sportspeople in Japan
Association football forwards